Lyodura was a medical product used in neurosurgery that has been shown to transmit Creutzfeldt–Jakob disease, a degenerative neurological disorder that is incurable, from affected donor cadavers to surgical recipients.  Lyodura was introduced in 1969 as a product of B. Braun Melsungen AG, a leading hospital supply company based in Germany.

The product was used as a quick and effective patch material for surgery on the brain.  It was a section of freeze-dried tissue which could be stored for extended periods on hospital shelves and could be made ready for use simply by soaking it in water for a few minutes.

What was not known by the consumer was the origin of the source material, the efficacy of its processing methods, and the danger of its use.

The raw material for Lyodura was the dura mater of a human cadaver.  The tissue would usually be harvested during an autopsy and then sold to the manufacturer.  After neurological diseases were linked to use of Lyodura, an investigation determined that the manufacturer had obtained the donor tissue by black market methods.  Autopsy staff would remove the tissue from cadavers, regardless of whether the deceased's family had agreed to an autopsy or not, and sell it in quantity to representatives of the manufacturer.  Due to this illegal method of collection, no record of patient history accompanied the tissue to production.

Large quantities of the harvested tissue would be mass sterilized in a heated vat.  The tissue would then be freeze dried and packaged for purchase.  The manufacturer believed that its sterilization procedure was sufficiently powerful to render any tissue harmless and was therefore unconcerned about cross-contamination from CJD-containing tissue to other tissue in the same sterilization vat.  It is now believed that almost all Lyodura product was tainted with Creutzfeldt–Jakob disease through this process.

An award-winning documentary was produced on the subject. The Canadian Broadcasting Corporation's The Fifth Estate segment, "Deadly Harvest", dealt with the product's history, sale in Canada, and health effects worldwide. According to the documentary, there have been more than 70 CJD-related deaths in Japan since Lyodura's distribution. The product has since been banned for use in Canada.

External links
The Medical Journal of Australia - detailed article about Lyodura-CJD link
CDC - Case histories of Lyodura-CJD patients
CBC's The Fifth Estate awards website
CBC news article announcing Lyodura ban. 2002
FDA import alert from 1987 regarding CJD tainted Lyodura

Medical scandals
Drug safety